Lars Rosenberg (born 2 February 1971) was a bass guitarist in several musical bands: Therion (1994–1996), Entombed (1990–1995), Taura (2000–2002) Serpent, Roachpowder, Carbonized, Mental Distortion, Monastery and Furcas. He is also a vocalist in Carbonized and Monastery.

Notes

References 
 

Therion (band) members
Swedish heavy metal bass guitarists
Swedish heavy metal singers
Living people
1971 births
21st-century bass guitarists
Carbonized members
Entombed (band) members
Serpent (band) members